Chang Wea (born 12 July 1933) is a Taiwanese politician.

Chang was born in Tengzhou on 12 July 1933. He was director of the Hualien branch of the Veterans Affairs Council from 1 July 1992. Chang was seated as a member of the Legislative Yuan on 15 March 1995, replacing Hsieh Shen-shan, who had been named head of the Council of Labor Affairs in 1994.

References

1933 births
Living people
Hualien County Members of the Legislative Yuan
Members of the 2nd Legislative Yuan
People from Zaozhuang
Chinese Civil War refugees
Republic of China politicians from Shandong
Taiwanese people from Shandong